The Retezat National Park is a protected area (national park category II IUCN)  located in the Retezat Mountains in Hunedoara county, Romania.

Description 
In 1935, the Government of Romania set aside an area of the Retezat Mountains creating the country's first national park.

Currently the park has . The area shelters one of Europe's last remaining intact old-growth forest and the continent's largest single area of pristine mixed forest. Vf. Peleaga, the highest peak of the Retezat Mountains,  is located in the park. The park also includes about eighty glacier lakes.

In 1979, the Man and Biosphere Program of UNESCO included the park in the international network of biosphere reserve.

Flora and fauna 
The flora consists of approximately 1,190 plant species, of which 130 have the "endangered" or "vulnerable" status. Wolves, brown bear, wild boar, Eurasian lynx, European wildcat, chamois, roe deer and red deer as well as small carnivore species such as Eurasian badger and Eurasian otter populate the park.

The Gemenele ("The Twins" in Romanian) scientific reserve is a strictly protected area of the park enclosing an intact old-growth forest.

See also 
 Seven Natural Wonders of Romania

References

External links

Official site
Map of the Park
Jiu Valley Portal - the home of the Official Jiu Valley City Websites and a gateway to the Retezat National Park and other destinations in the Transylvanian Alps
Maps of the Retezat and other mountain ranges in the Transylvanian Alps
Touristic Maps of the Retezat Mountains

National parks of Romania
Biosphere reserves of Romania
Geography of Hunedoara County
Old-growth forests
Protected areas established in 1935
Protected areas of the Carpathians
Tourist attractions in Hunedoara County